Thomas Nybo Riis (born 31 August 1992) is a Danish cyclist.

Riis started with competitive cycling in 2010 and in just over a year he rose to compete among the best Danish amateurs in the A Class. In 2011 he took part in the Tour of Denmark as the youngest participant. He took part in the Italian stage race Giro della Lunigiana as a member of an English team. 
He signed a contract with Team Blue Water Cycling in 2012.

Thomas Riis lives in Silkeborg and is the son of Bjarne Riis of his first marriage with Mette Nybo Riis.

References

External links
Thomas Riis at procyclingstats.com

1992 births
Living people
Danish male cyclists
People from Silkeborg
Sportspeople from the Central Denmark Region